Ministry of Industries and Mines of Iran, was the main organ of Iranian Government in charge of the regulation and implementation of policies applicable to industrial and mine sectors.

Being originally under the ministry of Trade in 1906, it was formed under the title of Ministry of Industries and Mines in 1973, and later after a series of splits and merges, it was formed again by the merger of the ministry of Mines and Metals and the ministry of Industries in the year 2000.

Missions of the ministry
The missions of the ministry includes the regulation of strategies for industrial and mining developments, determining policies and plans for these sectors, and improving the efficiency and productivity of these sectors, as well as supervising, directing and supporting them. The missions also include the promotion of export of industrial and mining products and engineering and technical services, as well as improvement of management, productivity and entrepreneurship in these sectors, and the issuance of license for the related production units.

Deputies
The ministry consists of five deputies as: 
Deputy for Human Resources Development & Support
Deputy for Legal Parliamentary & Provisional Affairs
Deputy for Planning Development & Technology
Deputy for Mining & Mining Industries
Deputy for Industry & Economic Affairs

See also
Cabinet of Iran
Government of Iran
Industry of Iran
Mining in Iran
Iran Chamber of Commerce Industries and Mines
Iran Marine Fund
Bank of Industry and Mine
Industrial Development and Renovation Organization of Iran
IMIDRO
Geological Survey and Mineral Exploration of Iran

References

External links

Official Website

1906 establishments in Iran
2011 disestablishments in Iran
Iran
Iran, Industries and Mines
Industries and Mines
Ministry of Industry, Mine and Trade (Iran)